Mirza's eastern moss rat (Mirzamys norahae) is a species of rodent endemic to New Guinea.

References

Helgen, K.M.; Helgen, L.E. 2009: Biodiversity and biogeography of the moss-mice of New Guinea: a taxonomic revision of Pseudohydromys (Muridae: Murinae). pp. 230–313 in Voss, R.S. & Carleton, M.D. (eds.) Systematic mammalogy: contributions in honor of Guy G. Musser. Bulletin of the American Museum of Natural History, (331)

Mirzamys
Rats of Asia
Endemic fauna of New Guinea
Rodents of New Guinea
Rodents of Indonesia
Rodents of Papua New Guinea
Mammals described in 2009